Pseudophaeobacter is a genus of bacteria.

References 

Rhodobacteraceae